Félicité du Jeu is a French actress. She is best known for her role as DC Stella Goodman in the BBC drama Waking the Dead.

Early life
Du Jeu studied at the Conservatoire d'Art Dramatique de Saint-Germain-en-Laye from 1992 to 1996, and took the Jean Périmony course the following two years, for which she received the Louis Jouvet prize in 1997. She went on to the London Academy of Music and Dramatic Art and received a special commendation for the Ian Charleson Award for her role as Katherine in Henry V in 2003 with the National Theatre. Before that most of her experience had been gained in theatre in France including Théâtre Dejazet and Théâtre de Boulogne.

Career
She starred in the BBC show Waking the Dead, appearing from the fifth series until the opening episode of the eighth series. Her character was killed off when she suffered a thrombosis after being shot in the leg,thus becoming the second female officer in the show to be killed off, the other being Mel Silver, played by Claire Goose, at the end of series four.

Personal life
A multilingual (French, Italian, Swedish and English) actress, du Jeu acts in French and English.

Filmography

References

External links

Year of birth missing (living people)
Living people
French film actresses
French stage actresses
French television actresses
French people of Swedish descent
French people of English descent
French expatriates in England
Alumni of the London Academy of Music and Dramatic Art
20th-century French actresses
21st-century French actresses